The Ardhana class is a class of patrol boat that was built for the United Arab Emirates Navy in the early 1970s and commissioned in 1975. As of 2009 all six vessels remain in service, though it has been announced that they will be decommissioned and replaced by the Baynunah-class corvette.

Units
 P3301 Ardhana
 P3302 Zurara
 P3303 Murban
 P3304 Al Ghullan
 P3305 Radoom
 P3306 Ghanadhah

Ships of the United Arab Emirates Navy